List of sex-hormonal medications available in the United States may refer to:

 List of androgens/anabolic steroids available in the United States
 List of estrogens available in the United States
 List of progestogens available in the United States

See also
 List of combined sex-hormonal preparations
 List of steroids
 List of steroid esters

References

Steroids
Sex-hormonal medications available in the United States